Romain Folz (born 28 June 1990) is a French football manager who manages AmaZulu.

Career

In 2018, Folz was appointed manager of American side West Virginia United. In 2019, he was appointed assistant manager of Uganda. After that, he was appointed assistant manager of Pyramids in Egypt. In 2020, Folz was appointed manager of Ghanaian club Bechem United. After that, he was appointed assistant manager of Niort in France. 

In 2021, he was appointed manager of Ghanaian team Ashanti Gold. After that, Folz was appointed manager of Township Rollers in Botswana. In 2022, he was appointed manager of South African side Marumo Gallants.

References

Living people
1990 births
Expatriate football managers in Botswana
Expatriate football managers in Egypt
Expatriate football managers in Ghana
Expatriate football managers in Morocco
Expatriate football managers in Uganda
French football managers
Expatriate soccer managers in South Africa
AmaZulu F.C. managers